Niphadophylax mexicanus is a species of moth of the family Tortricidae. It is found in Puebla, Mexico.

The length of the forewings is 7 mm. The ground colour of the forewings is greyish, but whiter towards the basal blotch and tinged with brown in the distal area. The markings and spots are brown. The hindwings are whitish, tinged grey beyond the middle.

Etymology
The species name refers to the country of Mexico.

References

Moths described in 2004
Euliini
Moths of Central America
Taxa named by Józef Razowski